Statistics of Division 2 in the 1975–76 season.

Overview
It was contested by 36 teams, and Stade Rennais and Angers won the championship.

League tables

Group A

Group B

Championship play-offs

|}

Promotion play-offs

|}

Top scorers

References
France - List of final tables (RSSSF)

Ligue 2 seasons
French
2